Fare zone 1 is the central zone of Transport for London's zonal fare system used by the London Underground, London Overground, Docklands Light Railway and National Rail. For most tickets, travel through Zone 1 is more expensive than journeys of similar length not crossing this zone. The zone contains all the central London districts, most of the major tourist attractions, the major rail terminals, the City of London, and the West End.

Background

London is split into six approximately concentric zones. Zone 1 covers the West End, the Holborn district, Kensington, Paddington and the City of London, as well as Old Street, Angel, Pimlico, Tower Gateway, Aldgate East, Euston, Vauxhall, Elephant & Castle, Borough, London Bridge, Earl's Court, Marylebone, Edgware Road, Lambeth North and Waterloo. Every London Underground line has stations in zone 1. The zone originates from two central London zones that were created on 4 October 1981 named City and West End, in which flat fares applied, replaced in 1983 by Zone 1.

List of stations

The following stations are in zone 1, and were in the 1981-1983 City and West End zones as shown:

Changes
April 2010: Addition of Shoreditch High Street
May 2021: Kennington from Zone 2 to Zone 1/2 boundary
20 September 2021: Addition of Battersea Power Station and Nine Elms

See also
 List of London Underground stations
 List of London railway stations
 List of Docklands Light Railway stations
 List of busiest London Underground stations
 London Underground stations that are listed buildings

References

 
London transport-related lists